Kalhovdfjorden is a lake belonging to the municipality of Tinn in Vestfold og Telemark county in southern Norway. 
Kalhovdfjorden belongs to the catchment of the river Skien. The river Mår comes out of the lake. The lake is part of the Skiensvassdraget. To the north lies Geilo, to the south lie the lakes Møsvatn, Gøystavatnet and Lake Tinn. 

Lakes of Vestfold og Telemark
Tinn